The Irish Wheelchair Association (IWA) is a charity in Ireland that has been working with people with physical disabilities since its foundation in 1960. It has 2,000 registered volunteers across its 32 volunteer branches. The IWA’s objectives are to advocate for the rights of people with physical disabilities by influencing public policy, the provision of different services, and support to its members.

The first chairman of the Irish Wheelchair Association was Fr. Leo Close CM, a wheelchair user.

The IWA provided resource and outreach services to 2,064 people in 57 locations in 2016.

References

External links
 

1960 establishments in Ireland
Charities based in the Republic of Ireland
Charities for disabled people
Disability organisations based in the Republic of Ireland
Organizations established in 1960
Seanad nominating bodies